The Great Western Railway (GWR) Ariadne Class and Caliph Class were broad gauge  0-6-0 steam locomotives designed for goods train work by Daniel Gooch and are often referred to as his Standard Goods locomotives.

The class was introduced into service between May 1852 and March 1863, and were built in seven lots at Swindon with a total of 102 locomotives. All were withdrawn between 1871 and 1883 except for Europa, which was extensively rebuilt in 1869 and survived until the end of the GWR broad gauge in May 1892.

Naming

References

 
 

Ariadne
0-6-0 locomotives
Broad gauge (7 feet) railway locomotives
Railway locomotives introduced in 1852
Freight locomotives